Adil Serraj (born 26 August 1979) is a Moroccan footballer who currently plays for Renaissance de Berkane. He usually plays as defender.

Career
Serraj began playing football for the Raja Casablanca youth sides under manager Abdesalam Serraj, his father and former Raja player. He joined Raja's first team in 1998, making his debut in a league match against FAR Rabat. Serraj would win the 1999 Moroccan first division, 1999 CAF Champions League and 2000 CAF Super Cup with Raja. The club qualified for the 2000 FIFA Club World Cup in Brazil, and Serraj was a member of the squad but did not play.

Looking for more playing time, he joined Chabab Mohammédia, but left the club after just two months. He would spend the next two seasons with FUS Rabat, but after the club was relegated from the first division in 2003, he joined Wydad Casablanca.

He would next join FAR Rabat, and would help the club win the CAF Cup in 2005.

References

External links

1979 births
Living people
Footballers from Casablanca
Moroccan footballers
Morocco international footballers
Raja CA players
Association Salé players
Fath Union Sport players
Wydad AC players
AS FAR (football) players
Kawkab Marrakech players
RS Berkane players
COD Meknès players
Association football defenders
SCC Mohammédia players